The Providence Grays were a Major League Baseball franchise based in Providence, Rhode Island from  to . Providence played their home games at the Messer Street Grounds, which was located in the Olneyville neighborhood of Providence. The Grays were officially organized on January 16, 1878 by Benjamin Douglas, who became the team's general manager. Henry Root was hired as the team president‚ and Tom Carey was initially hired to be the on-field captain, whose duties were similar to the modern-day manager. On January 21, 1878, Providence applied for membership in the NL, and was officially approved on February 6. On April 10, Root took over ownership of the team, fired Douglas for incompetence and insubordination, and hired Tom York to replace Carey as captain.

Providence was successful in signing several star players for their inaugural season: Paul Hines had played the previous four seasons with the Chicago White Stockings; Tom Carey was signed after the Hartford Dark Blues folded; Doug Allison was the catcher for the 1869 Cincinnati Red Stockings, who had an 84-game winning streak from 1869 to 1870; and John Montgomery Ward, who was playing his first season in the major leagues. Ward had a win–loss record of 22–13 and Hines led the league in home runs, runs batted in (RBIs), and batting average as the Grays finished in third place among the six teams in the NL for the 1878 season, with a record of 33 wins, 27 losses, and 2 ties. The Grays won the NL championship in 1879, placing first among the league's eight teams with Ward winning 47 games as their starting pitcher, and the leadership of George Wright, who played second base and also managed. The team had a strong hitting line-up with Hines' league leading .357 batting average, as well as new additions Jim O'Rourke and Joe Start, who both had batting averages over .300. William Edward White, a Brown University player who played one game for the Grays on June 21, 1879, may have been the first African-American to play at the major league level; according to Peter Morris of the Society for American Baseball Research, the evidence for White is strong, but not conclusive. If this claim is true, then White pre-dated both Moses Fleetwood Walker and his brother Weldy Walker, who both played for the 1884 Toledo Blue Stockings of the American Association (AA). In 1880, the Grays finished in second place among the eight NL teams, with Ward winning 39 games. On June 17 of that year, Ward pitched the second perfect game in major league history.

For the 1881 season, the Grays signed pitcher Charles Radbourn, who split the starting duties with Ward over the next two seasons. Radbourn won 25 games in 1881 and 33 more in 1882, while Ward won 18 and 19 respectively. In 1882, the Grays hired Harry Wright to be their manager, who brought back his brother George to play shortstop. They placed second in the NL standings, behind the White Stockings, for the third straight season. In 1883, the team dropped to third place, though Radbourn was credited with 48 victories and on July 25, he threw a no-hitter. Harry Wright left the team before the 1884 season, and was replaced by Frank Bancroft. On June 7, 1884, pitcher Charlie Sweeney struck out 19 batters in a nine-inning game, the unofficial record that stood until Roger Clemens surpassed that total with 20 in a game on April 29, 1986. On July 22, manager Brancroft wanted to replace Sweeney in the line-up with right fielder and alternate pitcher Cyclone Miller, but Sweeney refused the move and left the game. He was suspended without pay, but quit the team instead and signed to play for the St. Louis Maroons of the Union Association (UA). Without any other viable long-term pitching options, this result forced Radbourn to pitch nearly every game for the remainder of the season. Not only did Radbourn finish with 59 victories, an all-time record, but he also led the league in many pitching categories including strikeouts and earned run average, winning the triple crown. His leadership on the field led the team to their second and last NL championship; later besting the New York Metropolitans 3 games to zero in the 1884 World Series. The Grays' final season was in 1885, a season in which they finished at their lowest position in the standings in their history, as well as having their worst winning percentage. Following the 1885 season, the owner of the Boston Beaneaters, Arthur Soden bought the team and its players for $6000.

Keys

Players

References
General
Burgos, Adrian. 2007. Playing America's game: baseball, Latinos, and the color line. University of California Press. .
Nemec, David. 2006. The Official Rules of Baseball Illustrated. Globe Pequot. .
Seymour, Harold. 1989. Baseball: The Early Years. Oxford University Press US. .
Specific

External links
Baseball Reference

Major League Baseball all-time rosters